Elizabeth Monroe  (16 January 1905 – 10 March 1986) was an English historian of South-west Asia.

Monroe was appointed Companion of the Most Distinguished Order of St. Michael and St. George in the 1973 New Year Honours for "services to Middle East studies".

Works
 (with A. H. M. Jones) A History of Abyssinia, 1935
 The Mediterranean in Politics, 1938
 Britain's Moment in the Middle East, 1914-1956, 1963
 Philby of Arabia, 1973

References

1905 births
1986 deaths
English historians
Companions of the Order of St Michael and St George